Galenika or Nova Galenika is an urban neighborhood of Belgrade, the capital of Serbia. It is located in Belgrade's municipality of Zemun.

Location

Nova Galenika is located on the north-western outskirts of Zemun. Elongated mixed residential-commercial-industrial neighborhood, mostly bounded by the roads of Batajnički drum (Батајнички друм) and Novosadski put (Новосадски пут), borders the neighborhoods of Goveđi Brod on the north, Gornji Grad on the east, Zemun Bačka on the south-east, Altina on the south, while in the west, the industrial zone extends into the directions of Zemun Polje, Kamendin and Batajnica.

Characteristics
The neighborhood consists of several parts, including old Galenika section. The Nova (New) Galenika section and the surrounding industrial and commercial areas. The neighborhood of Galenika originated from the 1960s as a separate neighborhood, outside of Zemun's urban center, as a settlement for the workers of the neighboring pharmaceutical factory Galenika A.B. Due to urban expansion, the neighborhood became an integral part of city during the 1980s.

Nova Galenika was designed by architects Ljiljana and Dragoljub Bakić.

Galenika residential sections have several parks with playgrounds, and numerous recreational sports terrains for basketball, football and volleyball. There is also walking path stretching around the neighborhood. Major retail chains have its supermarkets (Rodić, Maxi, ZIG, etc.) here. Galenika is very well connected with the rest of Zemun and Belgrade with public bus transportation lines: 84, 707, 17, 704, 706, 73. Population of the local community of Nova Galenika was 12,533 according to the 2002 census.

Galenika oversaw a recent rise in property prices and projected future growth. This is a result of the construction of the new bridge across the Danube (Zemun-Borča Bridge), as the river is less than 250 meters away from the neighborhood, separated from it by the neighborhood of Goveđi Brod.

Last boom in property prices is fueled by construction of the first primary school in the neighborhood, which was finished in 2009.

References

Neighborhoods of Belgrade